Decanema is a small genus in the dogbane family first described as a genus in 1838. The group is endemic to Madagascar.

Species
 Decanema bojerianum Decne. -  Madagascar
 Decanema luteifluens Jum. & H.Perrier - Madagascar

formerly included
Decanema grandiflorum Jum. & H.Perrier, synonym of Cynanchum grandidieri Liede & Meve.

References 

Asclepiadoideae
Apocynaceae genera
Endemic flora of Madagascar
Taxa named by Joseph Decaisne